Neri Raúl Cardozo (born 8 August 1986) is an Argentine professional footballer who plays as a midfielder for Venados. He is able to play on both sides of the field and is known for his ball control. He holds Mexican citizenship.

Cardozo made his debut for Boca Juniors in 2004 under coach Carlos Bianchi, he was a regular starter for the team for the next seasons, winning two Copa Sudamericana and the 2007 Copa Libertadores among other titles, in 2009 he moved to Mexico to play for Chiapas and in 2010 he moved was purchased by league champions Monterrey, he went on to win the Apertura 2010 tournament and three straight CONCACAF Champions League titles in 2011, 2012 and 2013 as well as a Copa MX title in his last game for the club.

Cardozo is one of the few players to win every continental title in America: the Copa Libertadores, Copa Sudamericana, Recopa Sudamericana and the CONCACAF Champions League.

Club career
Cardozo was born in Mendoza, Argentina. He was signed to the Boca Juniors senior squad from the Youth Divisions of Boca Juniors at 17 years of age. His debut for Boca was in a 0–0 draw on 16 February 2004 against Gimnasia y Esgrima de La Plata.

Cardozo has contributed to the many achievements that Boca Juniors have accomplished since he signed for them, including a Copa Libertadores title, two Copa Sudamericana and Recopa Sudamericana titles, the Argentine Torneo de Apertura title of 2005 and the Torneo de Clausura title of 2006. He too was a part of the Boca squad which played in the 2007 FIFA Club World Cup in Japan, Cardozo scored in the semi-final 1–0 victory against Tunisian side Étoile Sportive du Sahel before losing 4–2 in the final against AC Milan.

On 27 March 2008, in a Copa Libertadores 4–3 win against Colo-Colo, Cardozo assisted Rodrigo Palacio in scoring Boca's third goal and then scored the fourth goal himself.

On 3 January 2009, he was announced an official player for Chiapas, but got in legal problems when his former team Boca Juniors claimed that Cardozo left the team without consent.

On 28 December 2009, Cardozo was sent on loan (and later purchased by) CF Monterrey. On 16 February 2010, Cardozo made his debut with Monterrey, and became a quick starter in their line up, he led Monterrey to the quarter finals as first place, going as far as the quarter-finals, losing to Pachuca. Cardozo has already been seen by many European teams because of his great speed, good shot power, and great passing skills.

International career
Cardozo was a part of the Argentine squad that reached the semi-finals in the 2003 U-17 World Cup in Finland. Later that year he was called up to play for the Argentina Under-20 squad. Neri Cardozo started his youth international career in 2003. Neri also played in the Argentina Under-20 in the 2003 FIFA World Youth Championship that reached the semi-finals.  Two years later, Neri helped Argentina claim their fifth FIFA World Youth Championship; however, he missed the final due to suspension. Alfio Basile called up Cardozo for a friendly against Chile at senior level on 18 April 2007. Cardozo played 70 minutes of the match and Alfio Basile also said that Neri Cardozo has big talent and could also be a star player for Argentina national football team.

Honours
Boca Juniors 
 Argentine Primera División (3): 2005 Apertura, 2006 Clausura, 2008 Apertura
 Copa Libertadores (1): 2007
 Copa Sudamericana (2): 2004, 2005 
 Recopa Sudamericana (2): 2006, 2008 
Monterrey
 Liga MX (1): Apertura 2010
 Copa MX (1): Apertura 2017
 InterLiga (1): 2010
 CONCACAF Champions League (3): 2010-11, 2011-12, 2012-13

Querétaro
 Copa MX (1): Apertura 2016

Racing Club
Argentine Primera División (1): 2018–19

Argentina U20
 FIFA U-20 World Cup (1): 2005

References

External links
 
 Argentine Primera statistics at Futbol XXI  
  Statistics] at Irish Times
 Neri Cardozo at Football Lineups

1986 births
Living people
Sportspeople from Mendoza, Argentina
Association football midfielders
Argentine footballers
Argentina under-20 international footballers
Argentina youth international footballers
Argentine expatriate footballers
Boca Juniors footballers
Chiapas F.C. footballers
C.F. Monterrey players
Querétaro F.C. footballers
Racing Club de Avellaneda footballers
Defensa y Justicia footballers
Argentine Primera División players
Liga MX players
Argentina international footballers
Argentine expatriate sportspeople in Mexico
Expatriate footballers in Mexico
Naturalized citizens of Mexico